The Kyle Hills are a prominent group of volcanic cones, hills, ridges, and peaks that occupy the eastern part of Ross Island, Antarctica, between Mount Terror and Cape Crozier.

The hills were named by the Advisory Committee on Antarctic Names (2000) after Philip R. Kyle, Professor of Geochemistry at the New Mexico Institute of Mining and Technology, Socorro, who worked extensively in Antarctica over 28 field seasons, 1969–2000, completing six seasons under New Zealand Antarctic Research Program auspices, 1969–76. He was principal investigator on numerous National Science Foundation research projects in 23 seasons of field work under United States Antarctic Program auspices, 1977–2000, with focus on long-term research of the volcano Mount Erebus, and was in charge of the Mount Erebus Volcano Observatory, 2000.

References

Hills of the Ross Dependency
Volcanoes of Ross Island